Peter Gaffney is an American writer and editor. He is best known for his writing work on The Simpsons and Rugrats. 

He spent five years as a writer and creative consultant for MTV. He also made animated cartoons for both children and adults.

He wrote for Recess, which was created by fellow Rugrats writer Joe Ansolabehere and Rugrats creator Paul Germain.

Gaffney has also co-created Aaahh!!! Real Monsters with Gábor Csupó in 1994. The show was to air on Nickelodeon especially for Halloween. It lasted for fifty-two episodes and four seasons.

In 1997 he was a story editor for the short-lived Disney series Nightmare Ned.

He has edited books such as The Herodotus File and had many ideas and concepts developed. He now divide his time between the Hollywood Hills and he shares with his father and Gretel, their dog, a home near Lake Arrowhead.

Filmography

Television
 Married... with Children (1991)
 Clarissa Explains It All (1991)
 Rugrats (1992–1994)
 Beethoven (1994)
 Aaahh!!! Real Monsters (1994–1997)
 Beavis and Butt-Head (1994)
 Aeon Flux (1995)
 Jumanji (1996)
 Nightmare Ned (1997)
 Recess (1997–2000)
 Daria (1998)
 Downtown (1999)
 Roughnecks: Starship Troopers Chronicles (2000)
 The Weekenders (2000–2004)
 Lloyd in Space (2001)
 The Legend of Tarzan (2001)
 The Simpsons (2006–2011)
 Let's Go Luna (2018–2022)
 Thomas & Friends: All Engines Go (2021)

Film
 Quality Time with Uncle Spike (1987)

See also
Klasky Csupo

References

Writers from Los Angeles
American animators
American animated film producers
Television producers from California
Living people
Aaahh!!! Real Monsters
Year of birth missing (living people)
Nickelodeon Animation Studio people